Chivito (the diminutive of chivo, "goat") is, in Argentina, a type of goat dish.

Argentinian grilled meat
In Argentina, chivito is the grilled meat of a young goat eaten in Argentina, sometimes as part of an asado. Chivito differs from cabrito in that chivito is a slightly older animal with whose meat is less tender. A chivito has already begun to eat solid foods, whereas the cabrito is still a suckling.

The chivito is less gamey and has a more delicate flavour than the adult goat. It can be cooked a la parrilla (grilled) or a la cruz. In the chivito a la cruz, the chivito is affixed vertically to a cross which is driven into the ground near the fire, giving it a special flavour.

Every summer, a chivito festival is held in the town of Malargüe in the province of Mendoza, Argentina.

See also 
 List of goat dishes

References 

Goat dishes
Barbecue
Argentine cuisine